Melakalakudi is a village in the Papanasam taluk of Thanjavur district, Tamil Nadu, India.

Demographics 

As per the 2001 census, Melakalakudi had a total population of 876 with 452 males and 424 females. The sex ratio was .938. The literacy rate was 61.7.

References 

 

Villages in Thanjavur district